Nishvika Naidu is an Indian actress who works in Kannada cinema. She rose to fame with 2018 film Amma I Love You opposite Chiranjeevi Sarja.

Career

Naidu debuted in 2018 film Vaasu Naan Pakka Commercial opposite Anish Tejeshwar, but her second film Amma I Love You released initially. Her next movie was Padde Huli opposite Shreyas K Manju  followed by Jadesh Kumar's Gentlemen where she was paired opposite Prajwal Devaraj. She appeared in Chandan Shetty's Singles Party Freak. Her Next was Anish Tejeshwar's directral debut Ramarjuna where she is paired opposite Anish Tejeshwar for the second time after Vaasu Naan Pakka Commercial. She is also acting in Yograj Bhat's Gaalipata 2, B.S. Pradeep Varma’s Murphy in which she is paired opposite Prabhu Mundkur and Jadeshaa K Hampi's Guru Shishyaru in which she is paired opposite Sharan.

Personal life
Naidu was born in Bangalore, Karnataka, India. She is a graduate in psychology from Mount Carmel College, Bangalore.

Filmography

Music Videos

Awards

References

External links

 

Living people
21st-century Indian actresses
Actresses from Bangalore
Actresses in Kannada cinema
Actresses in Tamil cinema
Female models from Bangalore
Indian film actresses
Mount Carmel College, Bangalore alumni
1992 births